Declan Ryan may refer to:

 Declan Ryan (chef) (born 1943), Irish chef
 Declan Ryan (hurler) (born 1968), Irish sports manager